William Wirt Connelly (June 29, 1925 – November 27, 1980) was an American professional baseball player. A right-handed pitcher, his pro career extended from 1945 to 1957, with appearances in Major League Baseball in 1945, 1950, and 1952–53. The native of Alberta, Virginia, attended Hampden–Sydney College.

Connelly had a 6–2 record with a 6.92 earned-run average in the Majors with four different teams: the Philadelphia Athletics, Chicago White Sox, Detroit Tigers and New York Giants. Purchased by the Giants from the Triple-A American Association in August 1952, he won all five of his decisions during the last six weeks of the season, helping New York finish second in the National League. In 25 career games (including seven starting assignments) and 66 innings pitched, he allowed 71 hits and 53 bases on balls, striking out 34. He had no complete games, shutouts or saves.

External links

1925 births
1980 deaths
Austin Senators players
Baseball players from Virginia
Buffalo Bisons (minor league) players
Charleston Senators players
Chicago White Sox players
Detroit Tigers players
Little Rock Travelers players
Major League Baseball pitchers
Minneapolis Millers (baseball) players
New York Giants (NL) players
People from Brunswick County, Virginia
Philadelphia Athletics players
Richmond Virginians (minor league) players
Savannah Indians players
Toledo Mud Hens players
Toronto Maple Leafs (International League) players